Midnight Faces (1926) is a silent film starring Francis X. Bushman, Jr. and Jack Perrin. The film is an 'old dark house' murder mystery in the same genre as One Exciting Night (1922), The Ghost Breaker (1922), The Bat (1926) and The Cat and the Canary (1927).

Critic Christopher Workman called it "a thoroughly unmemorable entry in the run of old dark house horror comedies" handled with an "absence of style, atmosphere and wit ... Even at less than an hour, the film drags interminably." Conversely, Jonathan Rigby, in his book American Gothic, noted that the film "works some interesting variations on the standard clichés" and that "as rip-offs go, Midnight Faces is unusually engaging and intelligent."

Cast
Ralph Bushman - Lynn Claymore (credited as Francis X. Bushman Jr.)
Jack Perrin - Richard Mason, the lawyer
Kathryn McGuire - Mary Bronson
Edward Peil, Sr. - Suie Chang, the Chinese stranger
Charles Belcher - Samuel Lund
Nora Cecil - Mrs. Lund
Martin Turner - Trohelius Snapp, the black servant

Plot
Lynn Claymore inherits an estate in a Florida swamp from an uncle he never knew. His lawyer Richard Mason accompanies him to the property. A strange Chinese man is seen wandering the grounds at night, and a man in a cape is spotted skulking down the corridors by Claymore's clichéd "fraidy-cat" black manservant Trohelius. Then a young woman named Mary Bronson shows up, asking to be allowed in to escape an assailant with a knife who she says was stalking her.

References

External links
Midnight Faces at IMDB
AllMovie synopsis
Midnight Faces at Youtube.com

1926 films
American silent feature films
1926 mystery films
American black-and-white films
Films directed by Bennett Cohen
American mystery films
1920s American films
Silent mystery films
1920s English-language films